Night fever may refer to:

Nightfever, a night of prayer and part of the Nightfever initiative which is rooted in the Catholic Church
"Night Fever", a song by the Bee Gees
Night Fever (TV series), a karaoke style show airing in the United Kingdom on Channel 5 (1997-2002)

See also
Saturday Night Fever, 1977 American musical drama film directed by John Badham and starring John Travolta.
Saturday Night Fever (book), book by Nan Knighton
Saturday Night Fever (musical), a musical with a book by Nan Knighton (in collaboration with Arlene Phillips, Paul Nicholas, and Robert Stigwood) and music and lyrics by the Bee Gees